Jodie Lyn-Kee-Chow (born 1975 in Manchester, Jamaica) is an American interdisciplinary artist based in New York City. She is best known for her work in performance art. She teaches at the School of Visual Arts, and is a mentor in the New York Foundation for the Arts' Immigrant Artist Mentoring Program.

Education 

Lyn-Kee-Chow grew up in South Florida and holds a BFA from the University of Florida, and an MFA from Hunter College.

Exhibitions 

Her work has been exhibited at the Queens Museum of Art, Exit Art, Panoply Performance Laboratory, the Museum of Contemporary African Diasporic Arts, the Art Museum of the Americas, Grace Exhibition Space, the Open Contemporary Art Center in Beijing, and other institutions.

Recognition 
Lyn-Kee-Chow's work has been reviewed in the Huffington Post, Hyperallergic, and other publications. She has received awards from the Rema Hort Mann Foundation, the New York Foundation for the Arts, the Franklin Furnace Fund, the Queens Council on the Arts, and the Consulate General of the United States, Guangzhou. Her work is in the collections of the National Gallery of Jamaica and the Bianca Lanza Gallery in Miami Beach, among other institutions. Lyn-Kee-Chow is a former member of the tART Collective.

References

External links 

 Official website
 Article in Artilade
 Lecture at the School of Visual Arts

American performance artists
American women artists
Women performance artists
Feminist artists
Jamaican artists
Hunter College alumni
American contemporary artists
1975 births
Living people
University of Florida alumni
21st-century American women